The Tarzino Trophy also known as the Challenge Stakes is a Thoroughbred horse race run at Hastings Racecourse in Hawke's Bay and is New Zealand's first Group One race of the season. It is run over a distance of 1400m in September.

The race is the first of the Hawkes Bay Triple Crown events and is followed by:

 the 1600m Arrowfield Stud Plate in late September, and
 the 2040m Livamol Classic in October.

The race's timing, weight-for-age conditions and the reliably dry weather of the region at that time of the year combine to ensure that the race sees one of the strongest fields assembled in any race all season as a number of horses heading towards a campaign in Australia choose it as a starting point.

History
The Hawkes Bay Challenge Stakes was first run in April 1976 as a new Weight for age sprint to take place during the Hawkes Bay autumn carnival. The inaugural running of the event was won by New Zealand Racing Hall of Fame inductee Grey Way, ridden by Bob Skelton.

When the group grading system
was introduced in New Zealand in the 1978/79 season the Challenge Stakes was given group 3 status. In 1985 the race was moved from autumn to spring and was downgraded to listed status for a time, it would regain its group status in the 1991/92 racing season.

It was renamed the Tarzino Trophy in 2017. named after Tarzino, winner of the 2015 Victoria Derby and 2016 Rosehill Guineas and an active sire at Westbury Stud.

Name
 Hawkes Bay Challenge Stakes (1976-1989)
 Byerley Thoroughbred Stakes (1990)
 Russell's Toshiba TV Stakes (1991-1992)
 Russell's Akai Television Stakes (1993)
 Enerco Stakes (1994-1997)
 Mudgway Stakes (1998-2010)
 Makfi Challenge Stakes (2011-2016)
 Tarzino Trophy (2017–Present)

Group status
1976-1978 (Stakes Race)
1979-1983 (Group 3)
1984-1990 (Listed)
1991-1993 (Group 3)
1994-2002 (Group 2)
2003–Present (Group 1)

Notable winners
 Sunline - New Zealand Racing Hall of Fame and Australian Racing Hall of Fame inductee and arguably New Zealand's greatest mare, winning 13 group 1 races throughout Australasia including 2 Cox Plates.  
 Rough Habit - 11 Time Australasian group 1 winner and New Zealand Racing Hall of Fame inductee.
 W S Cox Plate winners Poetic Prince, Surfers Paradise and Ocean Park.
 Starcraft -  Australian visitor and subsequent European champion winning the Queen Elizabeth II Stakes in Britain and the Prix du Moulin de Longchamp in France.
 Mufhasa 10 Time group 1 winner and two time New Zealand Horse of the Year (2009, 2012)
 Melody Belle - 14 time group 1 winner including 13 in New Zealand (Record) and two time New Zealand Horse of the Year (2019, 2020).

Seachange, Kawi, Melody Belle and Callsign Mav are all back-to-back winners of the race.

Race results

See also
 Thoroughbred racing in New Zealand, includes a list of winners of all three Hawkes Bay Triple Crown races and other major NZ races
 Hawke's Bay Guineas

References

Horse races in New Zealand